Next Saturday Afternoon is the second full-length album by Thelonious Monster. It was released in 1987. It is included on the CD version of Stormy Weather.

Production
The album was recorded for $2,600.

Critical reception
Trouser Press called the album "a bit closer to conventional rock’n’roll and is the better for it," writing that the band "discovered melody, producing musically and lyrically impressive material like 'Next', 'Anymore' and 'Walk on Water'." The Los Angeles Times called the album "a stubbornly independent account of post-teen alienation; a record that mixes folk, jazz, blues and high-speed punk styles without regard to radio programming dictates." The Wisconsin State Journal wrote that the band's "musical style includes radical tempo changes from lazy blues to panicy punk within a single song."

Track listing 
 Swan Song (3:25)
 Lookin' to the West (2:49)
 Hang Tough (3:01)
 Michael Jordan (2:30)
 Low Boy (Butterflies Are Free) (2:47)
 Key to Life... Tonight (3:02)
 Walk on Water (2:15)
 Anymore (3:14)
 Saturday Afternoon (2:17)
 Zelda (1:10)
 Pop Star (2:47)
 Tree 'n' Sven Orbit the Planet (4:22)

Personnel 
 Bob Forrest — vocals
 Dix Denney — guitar
 Chris Handsone — guitar
 John Huck — bass
 Pete Weiss — drums

References

1987 albums